The Jimmy Winkfield Stakes is an American Thoroughbred horse race run at Aqueduct Racetrack on Long Island, New York at the beginning of each year. The event is for three-year-olds and currently set at a distance of seven furlongs on the dirt.

The Jimmy Winkfield Stakes is named for U.S. Racing Hall of Fame inductee James Winkfield, the last African American jockey to win the Kentucky Derby. He won it twice: with His Eminence in 1901 and with Alan-a-Dale in 1902.

This race was formerly known as the Best Turn from 1985 to 2004.

Records
Speed record:
 1:25.24 @ 7 furlongs: Haikal (2019)
 1:08.33 @ 6 furlongs: Fort Hughes (2011)

Most wins by a jockey:
 4 - Richard Migliore (1985, 1993, 1996, 2004)

Most wins by a trainer:
 3 - D. Wayne Lukas (1988, 1889, 1891)
 3 - Kiaran McLaughlin (2009, 2011, 2019)

Most wins by an owner:
 2 - Hobeau Farm (1994, 2001)
 2 - Shadwell Stable (2009, 2019)

Winners

References

Flat horse races for three-year-olds
Open sprint category horse races
Horse races in New York City
Recurring sporting events established in 1985
1985 establishments in New York City
Aqueduct Racetrack